Carlos Jose Pareja Rios (born July 7, 1950) is a Peruvian diplomat currently serving as Peru's ambassador to the United States, having assumed the office in September 2016.

Education 
Pareja earned a B.A. degree from the Pontifical Catholic University of Peru and a bachelor of laws from the University of San Martín de Porres.

Diplomatic career 
Pareja started his diplomatic career as Political Counselor at the Embassy in Washington from 1984 to 1990. The next three years he was the director of South American affairs in the Ministry of Foreign Affairs. From 1993 to 1997, he was a Minister-Counselor at the Embassy in Santiago, Chile.

After his service as Minister-Counselor at the Embassy in Santiago, Pareja returned to Peru and served as Chief of Cabinet for the Vice Minister of Foreign Affairs. The following year, he was appointed as National Director in the Directorate-General of Sovereignty and Border Development.In 2000, Pareja joined his first ambassadorial position in Madrid and in 2003 he was transferred to Switzerland, where he served in a similar position. In 2006, he returned to Lima and acted as Chief of protocol. From 2009 to 2014, Pareja served as Peru's ambassador to Chile. In 2014, he returned to the State Department as Director-General for the Americas. In 2015, he was transferred and continued to serve as Director-General in the Directorate-General for Africa, the Middle East and the Gulf Region.

Ambassador to the United States 
Since 2016, Pareja has been the ambassador of Peru to the United States of America.

On the morning of April 20, 2022, Ambassador Rios called the Secret Service to report a man attempting to break into Rios' official residence in the Forest Hills neighborhood of Washington, D.C. The Uniformed Division shot and killed the man.

Personal life 
Pareja is married with two children.

References

1950 births
Living people
Pontifical Catholic University of Peru alumni
Ambassadors of Peru
Ambassadors of Peru to Chile
Ambassadors of Peru to Switzerland
Ambassadors of Peru to the United States